Lucas Alves de Araujo (born 22 July 1992), known as Lucão, is a Brazilian professional footballer who plays for Portimonense as a defender.

Club career
On 15 February 2022, Lucão signed with Lamia in Greece.

References

1992 births
Living people
Brazilian footballers
Brazilian expatriate footballers
Swiss Super League players
Saudi Professional League players
UAE Pro League players
Primeira Liga players
Olaria Atlético Clube players
Atlético Clube Goianiense players
Sport Club Corinthians Paulista players
Club Athletico Paranaense players
VfR Aalen players
FC Biel-Bienne players
FC Le Mont players
FC Luzern players
Al-Tai FC players
PAS Lamia 1964 players
Al-Nasr SC (Dubai) players
Portimonense S.C. players
Expatriate footballers in Germany
Expatriate footballers in Switzerland
Expatriate footballers in Saudi Arabia
Expatriate footballers in Greece
Expatriate footballers in the United Arab Emirates
Expatriate footballers in Portugal
Brazilian expatriate sportspeople in Germany
Brazilian expatriate sportspeople in Switzerland
Brazilian expatriate sportspeople in Saudi Arabia
Brazilian expatriate sportspeople in Greece
Brazilian expatriate sportspeople in the United Arab Emirates
Brazilian expatriate sportspeople in Portugal
Association football defenders
People from Osasco
Footballers from São Paulo (state)